Sir Rowland Hill of Soulton ( 1495–1561), styled "The First Protestant Lord Mayor of London", was a privy councillor, statesman, scholar, merchant and patron of art and philanthropist active through the reigns of Henry VIII, Edward VI, Mary I and Elizabeth I.

He is associated with the publication of the 1560 Geneva Bible, and his name appears on its frontispiece.

He is associated with the first flowerings of Tudor English drama, which have been generally understood since at least the 1700s (see the writings of Thomas Warton) to have been in Shropshire in general at Shrewsbury School under Thomas Ashton in particular a generation before Shakespeare. Events hill was involved in may have shaped one or more character in that dramatist's of his plays. 

Hill was "influential at the highest level".

Early life
Rowland Hill was born of an ancient Shropshire family, at Hodnet, Shropshire about 1495. He was the eldest son of Thomas Hill and Margaret Wilbraham, daughter of Thomas Wilbraham of Woodhey, Cheshire. He had a younger brother, William, and four sisters, Agnes, Joan, Jane and Elizabeth.

Hill was born around the same time as George Vernon (d. 1555) whoes grand daughter Elizabeth married Henry Wriothesley, 3rd Earl of Southampton, who has been suggested as the dedicatee of Shakespeare's sonnets. 

He was apprenticed to a London mercer, Thomas Kitson, obtaining his freedom of the Company in 1519. He then became a leading merchant adventurer, with the centre of his business operations being in the parish of St Stephen Walbrook, where he owned a property fronting onto Walbrook. He was churchwarden of St Stephens between 1525 and 1526.

In 1538, Hill, along with Sir Ralph Waryn and a Mr. Lock invested in cargo in the George Mody; she never reached her port of destination, because Norwegian pirates pillaged her, with correspondence between Thomas Thacker to Cromwell recording: One Mody's ship, with goods of merchants of London, "from the mart," is taken by pirates of Norway, to the loss to Sir Ralph Waryn, good Mr. Lock, Rowland Hyll, and others, of 10,000l.Complaint was made to Thomas Cromwell was invoked to obtain letters from Henry VIII to the kings of Denmark, France and Scotland that search might be made. The loss to Hill and is coventurers was £10,000. The ship was recovered but not the cargo

Hill was prominent in the affairs of the Mercers' Company. He was warden between 1535–6, and between 1543–4 and 1550–51 and 1555–6.  His membership of the Mercers overlapped with Francis Wren, grandfather of Christopher Wren.

Publication of the Geneva Bible 
The 1560 Geneva Bible was a project he coordinated and published. This was the first mechanically printed Bible. This is the bible that was used by William Shakespeare, Oliver Cromwell, John Knox, John Donne, and others. It was also one of the Bibles taken to America on the Mayflower.

The project of preparing this Bible during the reign of Mary was extremely dangerous, and the forward highlights the perils attaching to those engaged in the project:"for God knoweth with what fear and trembling we have been now, for the space of two years and more day and night occupied herein,,, the time persecution sharp and furious."Royal permission was obtained from Queen Elizabeth for its printing in England. In the eighty-four years of its publication, some 140 editions of the Geneva Bible or New Testament were produced.

Association with early theatre/performance 
Hill was involved, with his friend and fellow lord mayor Sir Thomas Gresham, in revival of the Marching Watch or Mid Summer Watches in London.  In these pageants 15,000 citizens all in bright harness, with coats of white Silk or Cloath, and Chains of Gold, passed through London to Westminster, and round St. James's Park, and on to Holborn.

The long daylight of June caused the civic government to fear disorder; the Watch was originally a show of the city's policing force with armed men marching in the streets., but it evolved into an annual festival of street pageantry which reached its spectacular peak in Hill's time and evolved into the Lord Mayor's Show.

Hill's involvement is recorded in Lady Long's household-book at Hengrave, Suffolk, which notes that Henry VIII watched these marches from Mercers Hall with Jane Seymour; "the presence of more than 300 demi lunces and light horsemen" were a particular highlight.

He was a friend of Thomas Lodge, who witnessed his purchase of the manor of Soulton in 1556.  Hill paid for the education of his son (also called Thomas Lodge), who was the writer and dramatist who provided the source text for Shakespeare's As You Like It so it is possible that "To Rowland" (an alias also used by Michael Drayton) in Lodge's A fig for Momus (Eclogue 3) is addressed to Hill. It has also been speculated that Rowland Hill is inspiration for Rowland de Bois in As You Like It.

Public Offices 

In 1541–42, he was elected sheriff of the City of London, and is recorded as being hosted by the incumbent Lord Mayor and provided with "a great stagge and tow fatt buckes". by the king as he entered this office. From 28–30 March 1542, he was imprisoned in the Tower of London on the orders of the House of Commons, as a result of his 'abuse' of the Sergeant of Parliament sent to secure the release of George Ferrers, a member of parliament imprisoned for debt in the Bread Street Counter. King Henry VIII, took the side of the House of Commons in this case of member's privilege; however, he showed favour to Hill shortly after the affair by knighting him on 18 May 1542. This was during the prorogation of the parliament. Hill was elected to the Court of Aldermen on 9 November 1542 and elected a Sheriff of the City of London for the same year.

In the wake of the coup d'état against Protector Somerset, Hill took over as Lord Mayor for the year beginning in November 1549. This was a period of substantial religious uncertainty, but he oversaw some of the critical changes in the direction of godly Protestantism, including the removal of altars.  He was a close friend of Sir Thomas Bromley (a member of the Regency Council appointed for the minority or Edward VI) and was given a token under the will of that statesman. Of his conduct in office as Lord Mayor it was said "this mayor was a good minister of justice".

His mayoralty witnessed a determined campaign against moral offences, the wardmote inquests being required in April 1550 to make fresh presentments of ill rule, 'upon which indictments the lord mayor sat many times' (Hume, 167–9). The crusade was controversial because of Hill's readiness to punish wealthy offenders. Perhaps because of this determined moralism, which seems to have owed something to pressure from the Protestant pulpits, and perhaps because of the coincidence of his mayoralty with a decisive turn in the English Reformation, Hill is often described as the first Protestant lord mayor of London, but this tradition seems to date from no earlier than 1795, when a descendant, Sir Rowland Hill, Bt, erected an obelisk to his memory in Hawkstone Park, Shropshire.

He was a member of the Council of the Marches by 1551. He was a committed member of the court of aldermen, and attended nearly two-thirds of the meetings in the reigns of both Edward VI and Mary.

He was one of the City's representatives in the first parliament of Queen Mary's reign (October–December 1553), temporarily replacing Sir Martin Bowe (a Catholic); with Hill being regraded as a Protestant by many, this made Sir Robert Broke SL the only Catholic MP from London.

He endured a short spell of disfavour under Mary and was dropped from the commissions of the peace for Middlesex and Shropshire in 1554. I received, from Queen Mary two bucks of the season out of the great park at Nonesuch, on behalf of the city of London, in 1557.

He recovered the regime's confidence, however, such that in March 1556, when the Henry Dudley conspiracy to depose Mary was discovered (leading to a series of trials for high treason at the Guildhall) he was commissioned as a justices for oyer and terminer (an assize judge), along with Sir William Garrard, (that year's Lord Lord Mayor, presiding), along with Sir Roger Cholmeley, and Mr Recorder Sir Ralph Cholmley. In June Sir John Gresham of Titsey took the place of Hill on the bench for the indictment of Silvestra Butler, in the same matter.

In 1557, when he was appointed a Commissioner Against Heretics the command for which gave:full power and authority unto you, and three of you, to inquire... of all and singular heretical opinions...heretical and seditious book... against us, or either of us, or against the quiet governance and rule of our people and subjects, by books, lies, tales, or otherwise, in any county... [and] to search out and take into your hands and possessions, all manner of heretical and seditious books, letters, and writings, wheresoever they or any of them shall be found, as well in printers' houses and shops, as elsewhere, willing you and every of you to search for the same in all places, according to your discretions. Intriguingly, this commission to collect such materials overlaps with the Geneva Bible project in which Hill was also involved.  Nevertheless, later in the same year hearing the indictment of Sir Ralph Bagnall for treason.

Nevertheless, after the accession of Elizabeth he helped put into execution the Act of Supremacy and the Act of Uniformity.

Rowland Hill's protegee, Thomas Leigh, led the coronation procession and escorted the newly crowned Queen Elizabeth I through the streets of London on the day of her coronation, and he continued as a Privy Councillor to the young Elizabeth I in the early years of the reign, to the extent he was appointed a Commissioner for Ecclesiastical Cases in 1559, alongside Mathew Parker, newly appointed Archbishop of Canterbury. The warrant established the commission stated;having especial trust and confidence in your wisdoms and discretions, [We] have authorized, assigned, and appointed you to be our commissioners;[2] and by these presents do give our full power... from time to time hereafter during our pleasure to inquire,... for all offences, misdoers, and misdemeanours done and committed and hereafter to be committed or done contrary to the tenor and effect of the said several acts and statutes and either of them, and also of all and singular heretical opinions, seditious books,

Once again, under this commission, Hill had royal authority to collect important books.

A curious account survives of a rent payment ritual in London for the Merchant Taylors School in which Hill presided shortly before he died The xxx day of September my lord mayre and the althermen and the new shreyffes took ther barges at the iij cranes in the Vintre and so to Westmynster, and so into the Cheker, and ther took ther hoythe; and ser Rowland Hyll whent up, and master Hoggys toke ser Rowland Hyll a choppyng kneyf, and one dyd hold a whyt rod, and he with the kneyf cute the rod in sunder a-for all the pepull; and after to London to ther plases to dener, my lord mayre and all the althermen and mony worshiphulle men.

Associations 

Hill was a close friend of Sir John Gresham, who provided him with black gown to attend his funeral and whose executor he was.

Hill was a "trusty friend" of Thomas Seymore of Sudley Castle, and was given land at Hoxten for life under his will. He was said to " ‘knew much of the intent and purpose’ of Sir Thomas Seymour,

Bishop Ridley refers to Hill in his farewell his friendes in generall before his execution.

Rowland Hill was a guest of the family at the burial of youth actor, secret diplomat, Regency Councillor, Privy Councillor, Lord Chancellor Sir Thomas Wriothesley.

He was left a piece of gold in the 1552 will of Chief Justice Sir Thomas Bromley (died 1555) ‘for a token of a remembrance for the old love and amity between him and me now by this my decease ended’.  Hill was chief overseer to the Will of William Lok (ancestor of the philosopher John Locke )

He was an overseer for the will of Sir George Barne, who was Lord Mayor at the death of Edward VI.

Philanthropy 

Hill had a reputation for charitable virtue. In 1555 he established a school at Market Drayton in Shropshire. He was also closely involved with the establishment of the London hospitals. He was the first president of Bridewell and Bethlehem Hospitals from 1557 to 1558 and again between 1559 and 1561, and he held the post of surveyor-general of the London hospitals from 1559 until his death.  Along with Sir Martin Bowes, he prepared, in 1557, The Order of the Hospitals of King Henry the viijth, and King Edward the vjth, viz. St. Bartholomew, Christ's, Bridewell, St. Thomas's. By the Maior, Commonaltie, and Citizens of LONDON; Governours of the Possessions, Revenues, and Goods of the sayd Hospitals, Anno 1557."

Among Sir Rowland's civic/charitable works are to be found, with a focus in Shropshire in particular:

 the building in Atcham an Terne a new bridge in stone, along with two further timber bridges;
 annually clothing 300 of the poor;
 repairing Stoke church;
 a dole to the poor of London

He also supported schools, the Bethlem asylum and the new Bridewell hospital.  In 1557 the administration of Bethlem Royal Hospital became the responsibility of the Bridewell Governors. The post of President was established, with first occupant being Hill.

Hill shared his prominent role in the establishment of hospitals with Richard Grafton, who also had Shropshire heritage, and who was instrumental in printing the Great Bible.

Hill was also involved in the establishment of early labour exchanges and poverty relief.

Memorials and reputation 

A contemporary said of Sir Rowland: “Wheresoever a good dede was to be done for the common weal of his countrymen, he was ready to further the cause.’ 

Hill's charity had a stern edge, with the epitaph on his monument stating that he also enjoyed a reputation as 'a foe to vice and a vehement corrector',A friend to virtue, a lover of learning,

A foe to vice and vehement corrector,

A prudent person, all truth supporting,

A citizen sage, and worthy counsellor,

A love of wisdom, of justice a furtherer,

Lo here his corps lieth, Sir Rowland Hill by name,

Of London late Lord Mayor and Alderman of same.rArcher credits Rowland Hill among a series of mid-century mayors who were "stern moralists," Hill's credentials as an "anti-corruption campaigner" themes which were noted in the 2021 North Shropshire by-election, on account of his manor being used extensively during that campaign.

He died 28 October 1561 of strangury, according to the diary of Henry Machyn, and was buried at St Stephen Walbrook on 5 November.

A contemporary account of his funeral was as follows:The v day of November was bered in sant Stephen's in Walbroke ser Rowland Hylle, latt mare and altherman and mercer and knyght, with a standard and v pennons of armes, and a cott armur and a helmet, a crest, sword, and mantyll, and xj dosen of skochyons of armes; and he gayff a c. gownes and cottes to men and women; and ther wher ij haroldes of armes, master Clarenshux and master Somersett, and my lord mayre morner, the cheyff morner; ser Recherd Lee, master Corbett, with dyvers odur morners, ser Wylliam Cordell, ser Thomas Offeley, ser Martens Bowes and master Chamburlan althermen, and the ij shreyffes, and master Chambur . . and master Blakewell, with mony mo morners, and a 1. pore men in good blake gownes, besyd women; and the dene of Powlles mad the sermon; and after all done my lord mayre and mony and althermen whent to the Mercers' (fn. 48) hall and the craft to dener, and the resedu to ys plase to dener, and grett mon mad (fn. 49) for ys deth, and he gayff myche to the pore.The identity of Hill's wife, whom he had married by 1542, is unknown. She died during the year of his mayoralty, and since there were no children of the marriage, his heir was his brother, William, parson of Stoke on Tern; however he left property to the children of his four sisters:
Agnes Hill, who married John Cowper, esquire.
Joan Hill, who married George Dormayne, esquire.
Jane Hill, who married John Gratewood (died 8 August 1570), esquire, of Wollerton, Shropshire, the son of William Gratwood by Mary Newport, daughter of Thomas Newport of High Ercall, Shropshire, by whom she had a son, William Gratwood, who married Mary Newport, the daughter of Sir Richard Newport (died 1570) of High Ercall; Alice Gratewood (died 1603), who married the justice Reginald Corbet; and Margaret Gratwood, who married Thomas Jones (born 1550) of Chilton.
Elizabeth Hill, who married John Barker of Haughtmond in Shropshire, esquire.

Another of his heiress being Alice Baker alias Coverdale wife of Sir Thomas Leigh (who had been Hill's business junior and was also Lord Mayor of London), decedents of whom are Dukes of Marlborough, Viscount Melbourne (the Premier) and later Dukes of Leeds. Arrangements were made to grant Hill's coat of arms to Alice.
Within All Souls, Oxford University the arms of Robert Boyle appear in the colonnade of the Great Quadrangle, opposite the arms of Hill.

Property 
Hill acquired the manor of Soulton and built a palace there, the corps de logis survives as the current hall.

Hill also retained substantial interest in the Welsh Marches, and acquired extensive estates in Shropshire, Cheshire, Flintshire, and Staffordshire; between 1539 and 1547 he purchased large quantities of former monastic property including Haughmond Abbey.

His power in his native county was reflected in his appearance on the Shropshire commission of the peace between 1543 and 1554.

Portraits 

There are 16th-century portraits of Hill in the Museum of London and in the Mercers' Hall in Ironmongers' Lane, as well as at Attingham Park and Tatton Park. The last of these was exhibited in 1897 at Manchester City Art Gallery in a show called "The royal house of Tudor".

These portraits have French texts Inscribed as follows, at the top: ADIEU MONDE PUIS QUE TV DESCORS TOUT INFAMS…TOUT CHASTES TOUT A LA FIN ORLIVES TOUT. and are inscribed below in Latin: ROVLANDVS HILL . Miles Salopienfis vir bonus & fapiens quondam Maior Civilitatis Londini ac digniffimus Confull cruidem exiftens Qui auctoritatem opibu… / temporibus Regum Henrici octavi & Edwardi fexti florens diuerfas terras praedia ac poffessiones per qui fiuit eaq omnia falua conscientia abiq omni aliorum iniuria v… / damno Qualam fenescate ac in vltima aetatem vergente a rebus acquiredis prari abfinuit ac fuaforta contet fibi quieti vixit neq plura optabat. Multa preferia preclara / magna u..bat fanillia Bona que acquifiuifs et Liberaliter impendil Pauperib dedii, Scotafticis in vtrag academia exhibuit Leguleos aluit atq inalios pios vfus erogaui… / liberos fufcepit nullos ideog terras poffesionefq fuas inter cognates ac confang vinios diuifet Breuiter tanta pictate claruit quod fama faeta extendebat / reliquamq vitam fuani vigiliis timare ac contemplatione contenuit, ad honorem fummi dei ac in perpetuam lui nomins gloriam. There is a statue of him on a pillar in Hawkstone Park in Shropshire.

Notes

References

External links
A full scan of Hill's original 1560 Geneva Bible
Portrait of Sir Rowland Hill, Museum of London. Retrieved 19 November 2013.
Portrait of Sir Rowland Hill, National Trust Collection at Tatton Park.

1490s births
1561 deaths
Date of birth unknown
Politicians from Shropshire
English MPs 1553 (Mary I)
16th-century English businesspeople
English knights
Converts to Protestantism from Roman Catholicism
English Protestants
Knights Bachelor
16th-century Protestants
Sheriffs of the City of London
16th-century lord mayors of London
English philanthropists
Founders of English schools and colleges
Prisoners in the Tower of London
People associated with the Dissolution of the Monasteries